= Tu Vida es Mi Vida =

Tu Vida es Mi Vida was Spanish language radio program hosted by award-winning motivational speaker Maria Marín and was produced by Cumulus Media Networks en Español (through Cumulus Media). It has aired on hundreds of Spanish radio affiliates throughout the United States. Tu Vida es Mi Vida came to an end in 2011.

Tu Vida es Mi Vida (Spanish for "Your Life is My Life") is a mix of romantic and inspirational music with various interviews and talk. Each episode explores hot topics relevant for Hispanic women today, including relationships, work, and inspirational stories of women who have achieved their dreams.
